Richard L. Roeding (November 28, 1930 – October 6, 2017) was an American politician.

Roeding was born in Covington, Kentucky. He served in the United States Army during World War II. Roeding went to Xavier University and the University of Cincinnati and was a pharmacist. He was a member of the Kentucky State Senate from the 11th district, from 1991 to 2009. He was a member of the Republican party.

References

1930 births
2017 deaths
Politicians from Covington, Kentucky
Military personnel from Kentucky
Xavier University alumni
University of Cincinnati alumni
American pharmacists
Republican Party Kentucky state senators